Bucynthia marmorata is a species of beetle in the family Cerambycidae. It was described by Stephan von Breuning in 1963. It is known from Australia.

References

Desmiphorini
Beetles described in 1963
Taxa named by Stephan von Breuning (entomologist)